The 2016 FIBA Africa Basketball Club Championship (31st edition), was an international basketball tournament  held in Cairo, Egypt from December 7 to 16, 2016. The tournament, organized by FIBA Africa and hosted by Al Ahly was contested by 10 clubs split into 2 groups of five, the top four of each group qualifying for the knock-out stage, quarter, semi-finals and final.
 
Al Ahly Sporting Club from Egypt was the winner.

Draw

Squads

Preliminary round

Times given below are in EET UTC+2.

Group A

Group B

Knockout round
Championship bracket

5-8th bracket

9th place

Quarter finals

5th-8th place

Semifinals

7th place

5th place

Bronze-medal game

Gold-medal game

Final standings

Statistical Leaders

Individual Tournament Highs

Points

Rebounds

Assists

Steals

Blocks

Turnovers

2-point field goal percentage

3-point field goal percentage

Free throw percentage

Individual Game Highs

Team Tournament Highs

Points

Rebounds

Assists

Steals

Blocks

Turnovers

2-point field goal percentage

3-point field goal percentage

Free throw percentage

Team Game highs

All Tournament Team

See also 
 2015 AfroBasket

References

External links 
 
 

 
2016
2016 in African basketball
2016 in Egyptian sport
International basketball competitions hosted by Egypt
December 2016 sports events in Africa